Winlaw is a surname. Notable people with the surname include:

 Ashley Winlaw (1914–1988), English cricketer and schoolteacher
 Roger Winlaw (1912–1942), English cricketer
 William Winlaw (died 1796), English engineer